Ranasingh Kiteni is a village development committee in Baglung District in the Dhaulagiri Zone of central Nepal. At the time of the 1991 Nepal census it had a population of 2,673 and had 493 houses in the town.

References

Populated places in Baglung District